Edgar Catalino Zaracho Zorrilla (born 25 November 1989) is a Paraguayan football defender who plays for Sportivo Ameliano in the Primera División Paraguaya.

Career
Zaracho has played for Sport Colombia and Colón de Santa Fe of Argentina.

On 19 January 2022 of Paraguay's summer transfer window, Zaracho officially completed a transfer to Sportivo Ameliano. He joined coach Humberto García, with whom he was at General Díaz.

References

External links
 
 

1989 births
Living people
People from Fernando de la Mora, Paraguay
Paraguayan footballers
Paraguayan expatriate footballers
Club Atlético Colón footballers
General Díaz footballers
Argentine Primera División players
Expatriate footballers in Argentina
Association football midfielders